Christina Milian is an American R&B and pop singer. She has released three studio albums, six singles and one compilation album, in addition to six music videos on Island Records.

Milian's self-titled debut album was released in 2001, and features the singles "AM to PM" and "When You Look at Me"; both peaked in the top three on the UK Singles Chart. The singer's second studio album, It's About Time (2004), provided her first major US hit "Dip It Low". The single peaked at number two in the UK and number five in the US, and was certified Gold by the RIAA for digital sales. Milian's third studio album, So Amazin' (2006), produced only one single, "Say I".

A month after the release of So Amazin''', Milian's representative confirmed that she had left Island Def Jam Music Group due to "creative differences". After leaving Island Records, a greatest hits compilation, The Best of Christina Milian, was released in 2006 solely in Japan. Milian signed with Myspace Records and worked on her fourth album Dream in Color. A single was released in October 2008, ballad "Us Against the World". In 2009, whilst working with The-Dream, Milian left Myspace and signed to Interscope Records through The-Dream's Radiokilla Record. Producer Tricky Stewart confirmed that Milian had rebooted the album and a new single, yet to be decided, would be the first from the album. The album was renamed Elope''. In 2012, following her public divorce from The-Dream, Milian announced that she had signed a new deal with Young Money Entertainment, under Lil Wayne's guidance, she resumed recording the album confirming that some previously recorded material may still appear on the album.

Albums

Studio albums

Compilation albums

Extended plays

Singles

As lead artist

Promotional singles

As featured artist

Other appearances

Writing credits

Music videos

References

Discography
Discographies of American artists
Pop music discographies
Rhythm and blues discographies